Lucifuga subterranea, or the Cuban cusk-eel, is a species of cavefish in the family Bythitidae. It is endemic to Cuba. Within the caves, sinkholes and crevices in which it occurs it is common, it feeds on cirolanid isopods.

References

Bythitidae
Endemic fauna of Cuba
Freshwater fish of Cuba
Cave fish
Taxonomy articles created by Polbot
Fish described in 1858